John W. Champlin (1831–1901) was a member of the Michigan Supreme Court from 1884 until 1891.

Champlain was born in Kingston, New York and came to Grand Rapids, Michigan as an adult to study law with his brother.  He served as a judge of the Grand Rapids Recorders' Court and then as mayor of Grand Rapids starting in 1867.  In 1883 Champlin defeated Austin Blair in the election for the vacant seat on the Michigan Supreme Court.

After leaving the Supreme Court Champlin served as a law professor at the University of Michigan.

Sources

External links
Bio of Champlin

1831 births
Michigan state court judges
University of Michigan Law School faculty
1901 deaths
19th-century American judges
Justices of the Michigan Supreme Court